Okanagan-Boundary was a provincial electoral district in the Canadian province of British Columbia spanning the area from the Similkameen towns of Kaleden and Keremeos to Grand Forks and Christina Lake, and including the southern Okanagan towns of Okanagan Falls, Oliver, Osoyoos, Rock Creek and Greenwood.  The riding first appeared in the 1991 election as the result of a redistribution of the former riding of Boundary-Similkameen.  The same area is now part of West Kootenay-Boundary.

For other ridings in the Kootenay region, please see Kootenay (electoral districts).  For other ridings in the Okanagan region, please see Okanagan (electoral districts).

Electoral history 
Note:  Winners in each election are in bold.	

 
|Liberal
|Laurie McDonald
|align="right"|3,859 			 	 	 		 	
|align="right"|24.99% 
|align="right"|
|align="right"|unknown

|- bgcolor="white"
!align="right" colspan=3|Total valid votes
!align="right"|15,439 		 	 	
!align="right"|100.00%
!align="right"|
|- bgcolor="white"
!align="right" colspan=3|Total rejected ballots
!align="right"|285
!align="right"|
!align="right"|
|- bgcolor="white"
!align="right" colspan=3|Turnout
!align="right"|75.76%
!align="right"|
!align="right"|
|}	

 
|Liberal
|Bill Barisoff
|align="right"|7,011 	 		 	 	 		 	
|align="right"|38.85%
|align="right"|
|align="right"|unknown

 
|Natural Law Party
|Gregg Wilson
|align="right"|163	 	 	 		 	
|align="right"|0.89% 
|align="right"|
|align="right"|unknown
|- bgcolor="white"
!align="right" colspan=3|Total valid votes
!align="right"|18,282	 	
!align="right"|100.00%
!align="right"|
|- bgcolor="white"
!align="right" colspan=3|Total rejected ballots
!align="right"|83
!align="right"|
!align="right"|
|- bgcolor="white"
!align="right" colspan=3|Turnout
!align="right"|75.05%
!align="right"|
!align="right"|
|}	

Following the 1996 election the riding was redistributed.  Since the 2001 election the Boundary district area has been represented by West Kootenay-Boundary and the Okanagan towns by Penticton-Okanagan Valley.  The Similkameen towns (Keremeos, Kaleden, Hedley) were added to the Yale-Lillooet riding.

Sources 

Elections BC Historical Returns

Former provincial electoral districts of British Columbia